The Historic Preservation Overlay Zone of the City of Los Angeles in California has been hailed by historic preservation advocates for its pioneering program, which designates not just buildings but entire neighborhoods or districts as worthy of historic preservation.  

Most of these districts are areas dominated by Victorian and Craftsman single-family houses, but some are predominantly Mission Revival or Spanish Colonial Revival, and one (the Gregory Ain Mar Vista Tract) is a mid-century modern area.

List of HPOZs
The current HPOZs in Los Angeles, according to the Los Angeles Planning Division, Historic Preservation department, include:

See also
 :Category: Los Angeles Historic Preservation Overlay Zones.

References

Notes

Citations

External links
City of Los Angeles: Historic Preservation Overlay Zones
Los Angeles Conservancy: City of Los Angeles Historic Preservation Overlay Zones (HPOZ)

 

Los Angeles Historic-Cultural Monuments